Dexoxadrol (Dioxadrol) is a dissociative anaesthetic drug which has been found to be an NMDA antagonist and produces similar effects to PCP in animals. Dexoxadrol, along with another related drug etoxadrol, were developed as analgesics for use in humans, but development was discontinued after patients reported side effects such as nightmares and hallucinations.

References 

Dissociative drugs
Piperidines
Dioxolanes
Abandoned drugs